The AAA Latin American Championship (Campeonato Latinoamericano AAA in Spanish) is a professional wrestling championship promoted by the Lucha Libre AAA Worldwide (AAA) promotion in Mexico. The championship is generally contested in professional wrestling matches, in which participants execute scripted finishes rather than contend in direct competition.

History
The title was first announced on May 18, 2011, as part of a storyline, where wrestlers from American promotion Total Nonstop Action Wrestling (TNA) invaded AAA. It was revealed that on June 18 at Triplemanía XIX AAA's Dr. Wagner Jr. would face TNA's Rob Van Dam for the newly created AAA Latin American Championship. No qualification matches took place prior to the match. Wagner went on to defeat Van Dam in the main event of Triplemanía XIX to become the first champion. The physical belt was designed and crafted by All Star Championship Belts.

Reigns
There have been twelve reigns shared among twelve wrestlers. Fénix is the current champion, after defeating Taurus, Bandido, Hijo del Vikingo and Laredo Kid in a Winner Takes All match at Triplemanía XXX on June 18, 2022.

References

External links
AAA's official title history
Gallery for AAA Latin American championship belt

Lucha Libre AAA Worldwide championships
Continental professional wrestling championships
National professional wrestling championships